Wano is a Papuan language of the Indonesian province of Central Papua.

Phonology

As well as the monophthongs described above, Wano also has seven diphthongs: .

Allophony
The voiced plosives // and // are imploded word-initially and intervocalically. 
When a nasal occurs before //, // becomes a prenasalized voiced plosive [ᵐb]. Similarly, when a nasal occurs before // or //, they become, respectively, [ⁿd] and [ᵑɡ]. 
//, //, //, and //'s allophone, [ᵑɡ] become labialized before //, with // becoming []. 
The sequences /tj/ and /dj/ become the palatal fricatives / /.

Grammar

Nouns 
Inalienable nouns could be pluralized by suffixing -i (after consonants) or -vi (after vowels), while alienable nouns do not (similar to Indonesian, where pluralization is optional).

See also
Duvle-Wano Pidgin

References

Dani languages